Vent-Axia is a British manufacturer of ventilation, heating and air conditioning equipment, located in Manor Royal, Crawley, West Sussex.

History
The company was originally incorporated on 28 January 1933, and as Vent-Axia Limited private company on 4 April 1936, to produce and sell ventilation equipment. During the Second World War, the company made fans for 10 Downing Street.

The following year, Vent-Axia became a public company with shareholders. In 1957, the company, along with subsidiary Axia Fans, agreed a 99-year lease on a new  site at Manor Royal in Crawley. The company was acquired by the Hall Thermotank Ltd Group  and later was sold to Smiths Group in 1992, and became part of Volution Group when it was formed in 2002.

References

External links
Official website

Manufacturing companies of the United Kingdom
Companies based in Crawley